Xylosandrus pygmaeus, is a species of weevil found in Indonesia, Malaysia and Sri Lanka.

Description
Body length of the female ranges from 1.3 to 1.4 mm. Body light brown to dark brown. Antennae and legs are yellowish brown. Antennea with 5 funicular segments and obliquely truncate club. Pronotal vestiture is semi-appressed and with hairy setae. Pronotal base covered with a dense patch of short erect setae that resemble a pronotal-mesonotal mycangium. Pronotal disc is glabrous. Pronotum consists with lateral costa and carina. Protibiae with 4 socketed teeth, whereas mesotibiae with 6 and metatibiae with 5 socketed teeth. In elytra, discal striae and interstriae uniseriate are punctate. Declivital elytral face is convex, steep and abruptly separated from disc. Declivity is flattened.

A polyphagous species, host plants of the species are Litsea amara, and Vitex pubescens.

References 

Curculionidae
Insects of Sri Lanka
Beetles described in 1940